= Mauro Wolf =

Mauro Wolf ( October 26, 1947 - July 14, 1996) was an Italian sociologist, professor and essayist. He has developed important works in the field of sociology of communication and the media. His books are now considered classical texts in theoretical research on mass communication.

== Life and career ==
Born in the province of Trento, Italy, Mauro Wolf graduated from the Faculty of Social and Political Sciences at the University of Florence in 1970. In 1974 he worked as an assistant professor in the Department of Sociology at the Faculty of Education in Urbino. He returned to Florence in 1975, where he taught radio and television language techniques in the graduate program in Arts, Music and Performing Arts at the Faculty of Humanities. Soon after, he taught sociology of communication at the Communication Sciences Institute in Bologna, where he became a colleague and friend of Umberto Eco.

In the same decade, the researcher began writing essays on the media and attended international conferences on sociology of communication. In 1985, he became a contributor to the magazine Problemi dell'informazione, for which he wrote essays on sociology of the media.

In 1994, he founded and directed the Communication Sciences Library of the Baskerville Research Center, located in Bologna, composed of a series of essays on communication. Mauro Wolf also played an important role in the birth of the Bologna Journalism Training Institute.

Although he lived in the Italian cities of Urbino and Florence and his passage through Switzerland, the sociologist remained in the city of Bologna until his death on July 14, 1996 at the age of 49.

== Works ==
- Sociologie della vita quotidiana (1979)
- Teorie della comunicazione di massa (1985)
- Gli effetti sociali dei media (1992)
